Sylvie Quillian (born June 18, 1980 as Sylvie Robichaud) is a Canadian curler from Riverview, New Brunswick. She currently plays third on Team Andrea Kelly. She has won four New Brunswick Scotties Tournament of Hearts and was the New Brunswick provincial junior champion from 1999–2001.

Career

Juniors
Quillian skipped the New Brunswick team at three straight Canadian Junior Curling Championships from 1999–2001. She had a 6–6 sixth place finish in 1999 and a 4–8 eleventh place finish in 2000. Her best finish came in 2001 where she finished with a 7–5 record, just missing the playoffs.

Women's
Quillian won her first New Brunswick Scotties Tournament of Hearts in 2008 with teammates Danielle Nicholson, Marie Richard and Julie Carrier. At the 2008 Scotties Tournament of Hearts, her team finished in last place with a 1–10 record. She could not defend her title the next season, finishing 3–4 at the 2009 New Brunswick Scotties Tournament of Hearts. After once again not qualifying for the playoffs in 2010, Quillian and her rink of Nicholson, Richard and Kendra Lister finished 6–1 through the round robin of the 2011 New Brunswick Scotties Tournament of Hearts. They then defeated Rebecca Atkinson in the semifinal before losing the provincial final to Andrea Crawford 7–2. Her rink also qualified for the playoffs the following year, before losing in the semifinal to Mary Jane McGuire.

After another semifinal loss in 2013, Quillian made the provincial final again in 2014 where she once again faced Crawford. Up 7–6 in the last end, her team gave up two points and lost the match 8–7. She would finally win her second provincial title in 2015 where her new rink of Atkinson, Richard and Jane Boyle defeated Melissa Adams 7–6 in the provincial final. At the 2015 Scotties Tournament of Hearts in Moose Jaw, Saskatchewan, New Brunswick defeated higher seeds such as Ontario's Julie Hastings and Team Canada's Rachel Homan, ultimately finishing the round robin with a 4–7 record. Quillian was able to defend her title at the 2016 New Brunswick Scotties Tournament of Hearts, sending her to her third Canadian championship in Grand Prairie, Alberta. At the end of the round robin, New Brunswick was placed last with a 2–9 record, meaning they would be relegated to the pre-qualification event the following year. Also during the 2015–16 season, her team played in the 2015 GSOC Tour Challenge Tier 2 Grand Slam of Curling event, where they lost in the quarterfinals to Jamie Sinclair.

Quillian and her new rink of Jessica Ronalds, Nicole Arsenault Bishop and Michelle Majeau began the 2016–17 season by winning the 2016 Jim Sullivan Curling Classic. They would not however win the 2017 New Brunswick Scotties Tournament of Hearts, losing in a tiebreaker to Melissa Adams. After the season, Adams joined the team at third, with Arsenault Bishop remaining at second and Lister returning to play lead. It proved to be a successful move as the Quillian (Robichaud at the time) rink won the 2018 New Brunswick Scotties Tournament of Hearts. At the 2018 Scotties Tournament of Hearts, Quillian would have her most successful Scotties to date, finishing the new pool play format with a 4–3 record. This placed them fifth in their pool, not enough to qualify for the Championship Pool. The following season, the team would win the 2018 Tim Hortons Spitfire Arms Cash Spiel on the World Curling Tour. At provincials, they lost in the semifinal to Sarah Mallais. The following season they made the final of the 2020 New Brunswick Scotties Tournament of Hearts, before losing to the Crawford rink 6–3. After the season, Crawford's third Jennifer Armstrong moved to Saskatchewan and Quillian took her place at third on the team.

Due to the COVID-19 pandemic in New Brunswick, the 2021 provincial championship was cancelled. As the reigning provincial champions, Team Crawford was given the invitation to represent New Brunswick at the 2021 Scotties Tournament of Hearts, but they declined due to work and family commitments. Team Melissa Adams was then invited in their place, which they accepted.

Team Crawford played in five tour events during the 2021–22 season, performing well in all of them. In their first event, The Curling Store Cashspiel, the team reached the final where they lost to Nova Scotia's Christina Black upon giving up a stolen victory. They then lost in the final of the Steele Cup Cash two weeks later to the Melodie Forsythe rink. They would then secure two victories in their next two events, going undefeated to claim the titles of the Dave Jones Stanhope Simpson Insurance Mayflower Cashspiel and the Atlantic Superstore Monctonian Challenge. The team then had a semifinal finish at the Stu Sells 1824 Halifax Classic, dropping the semifinal game to Switzerland's Corrie Hürlimann.

The 2022 New Brunswick Scotties Tournament of Hearts was cancelled due to the pandemic and Team Crawford were selected to represent their province at the 2022 Scotties Tournament of Hearts in Thunder Bay, Ontario. At the Hearts, the team began the event with five straight wins, the most consecutive wins to start a Tournament of Hearts of any New Brunswick team. Team Crawford finished the round robin with a 6–2 record, qualifying for the playoff round over higher seeded teams such as Wild Card #2 (Chelsea Carey), Wild Card #3 (Emma Miskew) and Saskatchewan's Penny Barker. They then defeated the Northwest Territories' Kerry Galusha in the knockout round and upset Team Canada's Kerri Einarson to reach the 1 vs. 2 page playoff game, becoming the first New Brunswick team to reach the playoffs since Heidi Hanlon in 1991. They then lost to Northern Ontario's Krista McCarville in the 1 vs. 2 game and Canada's Einarson rink in the semifinal, earning the bronze medal from the event. After the event, the team announced they would be parting ways with second Jillian Babin due to her relocation to Ontario. They then announced on March 4, 2022 that Jill Brothers would be joining them as their new second.

Mixed
Aside from women's play, Quillian has represented New Brunswick at two Canadian Mixed Curling Championships, skipping the team in 2011 and 2013. She had successful results on both occasions, reaching the semifinal in 2011 and losing a tiebreaker in 2013.

Personal life
Quillian works as a financial controller for Brona Transport Ltd. She attended the Université de Moncton. She is married.

Teams

References

External links

1980 births
Canadian women curlers
Curlers from New Brunswick
Living people
People from Riverview, New Brunswick
Sportspeople from Moncton
Université de Moncton alumni